The U.S. Department of Transportation Office of Inspector General (DOT OIG) is one of the Inspector General offices created by the Inspector General Act of 1978. The Inspector General for the Department of Transportation, like the Inspectors General of other federal departments and agencies, is charged with monitoring and auditing department programs to combat waste, fraud, and abuse.

The Inspector General is part of the U.S. Department of Transportation and assists Congress, the Secretary of Transportation, and senior department officials in achieving a safe, efficient, and effective transportation system that meets the national interests and enhances the quality of life.

Under the Inspector General Act of 1978, the Office of Inspector General is given autonomy to do its work without political interference. Although chosen by the President, Inspectors General are required to be selected based on integrity and ability, not political affiliation. The Inspector General Act of 1978 prevents officials in the scrutinized agency from interfering with audits or investigations and requires the IG to keep the Secretary of Transportation and Congress informed of findings, although much of OIG's work is accomplished with the cooperation of officials whose programs are being reviewed. Within the Office of Investigations, the OIG employs both criminal investigators and general investigators.

The OIG carries out its mission by issuing audit reports, evaluations, and management advisories with findings and recommendations to improve program delivery and performance. In fiscal year 2006, OIG issued 76 audit reports, which identified more than $893 million in financial recommendations.

History of Inspectors General

Audit 
The Office of Auditing and Evaluation supervises and conducts independent and objective audits and other reviews of DOT programs and activities to ensure they operate economically, efficiently, and effectively. This office is divided according to specific DOT program areas into four sub-offices: Aviation; Information Technology and Financial Management; Surface Transportation; and Acquisition and Procurement.

Leadership 
In 2006, President George W. Bush appointed U.S. Marine Corps Brigadier General Calvin L. Scovel III, to become the Transportation Department's Inspector General (I.G.) In January 2020, Scovel announced his retirement. In May 2020, President Donald Trump nominated Eric Soskin, a senior trial attorney in the Department of Justice for the last 14 years. He was from Indiana and was selected to replace Scovel. Soskin was confirmed by the Senate in December 2020.  Mr. Soskin was sworn in was sworn in as the Inspector General of the U.S. Department of Transportation on January 11, 2021.

Office of Investigations 
The Office of Investigations is composed of criminal and general investigators who are responsible for conducting criminal, civil, and administrative investigations of fraud and a variety of other allegations affecting DOT, its operating administrations, programs, and grantees (grant funds).  The Office of Investigation's top priorities involve crimes with a public safety impact, procurement and grant fraud schemes that significantly impact DOT funds, consumer and workforce fraud, and employee integrity violations. The Office of Investigations also manages a Hotline Complaint Center and investigates whistleblower complaints, including those referred by the U.S. Office of Special Counsel.

References

External links
 

Transportation Office of Inspector General
United States Department of Transportation agencies